Bretan is a surname. Notable people with the surname include:

Laura Bretan (born 2002), Romanian-American soprano singer
Nicolae Bretan (1887–1968), Romanian opera composer, baritone, conductor, and music critic